Millat Express is a passenger train operated daily by Pakistan Railways between Karachi and Lalamusa in Malakwal.

History
Initially the Millat Express was operated between Karachi and Faisalabad. Later it was extended to Sargodha and onward to Malakwal.

In June 2021, this train was involved in the 2021 Ghotki rail crash.

Route
 Karachi Cantonment–Khanewal Junction via Karachi–Peshawar Railway Line
 Khanewal Junction–Shorkot Cantonment Junction via Khanewal–Wazirabad Branch Line
 Shorkot Cantonment Junction–Malakwal Junction via Shorkot–Lalamusa Branch Line

Station stops

Equipment
The train offers both AC Business and economy accommodations.

Train crash

In June 2021, the Millat Express was involved in an accident causing at least 65 deaths. The Millat Express derailed initially without involvation of another train, but a few minutes later a further passenger train crashed into the wreckages.

References

Named passenger trains of Pakistan
Passenger trains in Pakistan